The Subaru R2 is a kei car produced and sold in Japan by Fuji Heavy Industries from 2003 to 2010. Its name was inspired by the Subaru R-2, produced from 1969 to 1972. The R2 was discontinued in 2010.

Design

The R2 was the first production Subaru to sport a new family look, including the aviation-inspired "spread wings grille" also used by their Tribeca and Impreza.

The R2's exterior dimensions are largely similar to its predecessor, the Subaru Pleo; but unlike the squarish Pleo, the R2 has a deliberately rounded, less space-efficient form.

Three variations of the 4-cylinder 658 cc engine were available:
 SOHC
 DOHC AVCS (variable valve timing)
 DOHC with supercharger and intercooler (R2 STi)

Unlike other Subaru models which used Boxer engines, the R2 used an inline engine.

The two lower engine options were available with either a manual transmission or a CVT. The supercharged engine was coupled to a sportshift version of the CVT ("7 speed iCVT"). Both front wheel drive and all wheel drive were available.

Initially, the R2 was available in 11 colors and 3 trim levels (one for each engine variation).

On January 4, 2005, the Subaru R1 was introduced, which was a 2-door version of the R2 with a shorter body and wheelbase.

In 2006, the R2 got a facelift, replacing its spread wings grille with one similar to the Subaru Legacy.

In popular culture
The Subaru R2 is a playable secret car in the arcade video game Wangan Midnight Maximum Tune.

References

R2
Kei cars
Front-wheel-drive vehicles
All-wheel-drive vehicles
Vehicles with CVT transmission
2010s cars
Cars introduced in 2003